The 2012–13 Skeleton World Cup was a multi-race tournament over a season for skeleton. The season started on 8 November 2012 in Lake Placid, New York, United States, and ended on 17 February 2013 in Sochi, Russia. The World Cup is organised by the FIBT who also run World Cups and Championships in bobsleigh. This season was sponsored by Viessmann.

Calendar 
Below is the schedule of the 2012–13 season

Results

Men

Women

Standings

Men

Women

See also
 FIBT World Championships 2013

References

External links 
 FIBT

Skeleton World Cup
Skeleton World Cup, 2012-13
Skeleton World Cup, 2012-13